Dawson City Water Aerodrome  was located adjacent to Dawson City, Yukon, Canada and was open from August to September.

The airport was classified as an airport of entry by Nav Canada is staffed by the Canada Border Services Agency (CBSA). CBSA officers at this airport could handle aircraft with no more than 30 passengers. It was one of only two water aerodromes in Canada, Dryden Water Aerodrome is the other, that is able to handle aircraft with more than 15 passengers.

See also
Dawson City Airport

References 

Defunct seaplane bases in Yukon
Buildings and structures in Dawson City